Joseph Lister Hubbard Jr. is an American attorney in Montgomery, Alabama. Hubbard formerly served as a member of the Alabama House of Representatives, representing the 73rd district, in Montgomery County. Hubbard was the Democratic Party nominee for the Office of the Attorney General of the State of Alabama in 2014.

Early life
Joe Hubbard was born and raised in Montgomery, Alabama. He received his primary education from the Montgomery Academy. In 2003, Hubbard graduated from Huntingdon College and enrolled in the Juris Doctor program at the Cumberland School of Law in Birmingham, Alabama. After graduating law school in 2006, he served as a law clerk to Alabama Supreme Court associate judge Champ Lyon before opening his own law firm.

Political career
In 2010, Joe Hubbard ran for and was elected to the Alabama House of Representatives as a Representative of Alabama's 73rd district. In addition to being one of the youngest members of the House of Representatives, he was also the only Democrat to successfully unseat a Republican in the state's 2010 general election when he defeated incumbent Republican House member David Grimes.

Hubbard's 2010 legislative campaign focused on several themes and he was often quoted discussing jobs, education and ethics reform.

In 2014, Joe Hubbard received the Democratic nomination for the Office of Attorney General of the State of Alabama. Hubbard was defeated by incumbent Republican Luther Strange. Following the 2014 election, Joe opened the Joe Hubbard Law firm in the Montgomery, Alabama.

In 2015, Hubbard briefly campaigned for Circuit Court Judge but dropped out of the race weeks later.

Legal career 

Joe Hubbard is a civil litigation attorney in Montgomery, Alabama.

References

External links

Year of birth missing (living people)
American Episcopalians
Cumberland School of Law alumni
Huntingdon College alumni
Living people
Democratic Party members of the Alabama House of Representatives
Politicians from Montgomery, Alabama
Lawyers from Montgomery, Alabama